Tritonal is a mixture of 80% TNT and 20% aluminium powder, used in several types of ordnance such as air-dropped bombs. The aluminium improves the total heat output and hence impulse of the TNT — the length of time during which the blast wave is positive. Tritonal is approximately 18% more powerful than TNT alone.

The 87 kg of tritonal in a Mark 82 bomb has the potential to produce approximately 863 MJ of energy when detonated. This implies an specific energy of approximately 9 MJ/kg, compared to ~4 MJ/kg for TNT.

See also
Torpex
Composition H6
Minol
Relative effectiveness factor (RE)

References

Explosives